This is a list of notable buffet restaurants. A buffet is a system of serving meals in which food is placed in a public area where the diners generally serve themselves. Buffets are offered at various places including hotels and many social events. Buffets usually have some hot dishes, so the term "cold buffet" (see Smörgåsbord) has been developed to describe formats lacking hot food.

Buffet restaurants

 America's Incredible Pizza Company – an American restaurant chain based in Springfield, Missouri, the restaurants are pizza buffets and entertainment centers
 The Attic (defunct) – a former 1,200 seat Smörgåsbord restaurant in West Vancouver, British Columbia that was open from 1968 to 1981
 Cabalen – a Philippine buffet restaurant chain primarily serving traditional Filipino entrees
 Chi-Chi's – a Mexican-restaurant chain operating in Belgium, Luxembourg, Austria, the United Arab Emirates, and Kuwait
 Chuck-A-Rama – a chain of buffet restaurants based in Salt Lake City, Utah with a focus upon American comfort food and meat entrees.
 Cicis – an American buffet restaurant chain based in Irving, Texas specializing in pizza
 Cosmo – a chain of 19 buffet restaurants in the United Kingdom
 Fresh Choice (defunct) – a former chain of buffet-style restaurants which operated in California, Washington, and Texas under the names Fresh Choice, Fresh Plus, Fresh Choice Express, and Zoopa
 Furr's (defunct) – a chain of family restaurants in the United States. For many decades Furr's was known for cafeteria-style dining, but has since redeveloped into buffet-style dining.
 Gatti's Pizza – a Southeastern United States pizza-buffet chain
 Godfather's Pizza
 Golden Corral
 Happy Joe's – some locations have a buffet
 Hoss's Steak and Sea House
 HuHot Mongolian Grill – an American restaurant chain specializing in a create-your-own stir fry cuisine 
 KFC – some locations include a buffet
 Mandarin Restaurant
 Moo Moo Restaurant
 Ovation Brands (defunct) – owned several American national chains of buffet restaurants, including Ryan's Grill, Buffet and Bakery, HomeTown Buffet and Old Country Buffet
 Pancho's Mexican Buffet
 Peter Piper Pizza
 Pizza Hut – full-size restaurants have a lunch buffet
 Pizza Inn
 Pizza Ranch
 Ponderosa Steakhouse and Bonanza Steakhouse 
 Round Table Pizza – some locations have a buffet
 Shakey's Pizza
 Shoney's
 Sirloin Stockade
 Sizzler
 Souper Salad
 Souplantation, also known as Sweet Tomatoes (defunct)
 Swagman Restaurant (defunct) – a former restaurant in Ferntree Gully, Melbourne, Australia, which opened in 1972 and burnt down in 1991
 Tahoe Joe's
 Taybarns (defunct) – a former British low cost all-you-can-eat restaurant chain owned by Whitbread
 Valentino's
 Western Sizzlin' – previously known as Austin's Steaks & Saloon
 Za Za Bazaar

See also

 Buffet
 Cafeteria
 Conveyor belt sushi
 Dim sum
 List of cafeterias
 List of casual dining restaurant chains
 Lists of restaurants
 Mongolian barbecue
 Salad bar
 Types of restaurant

References

 
Lists of restaurants